A Very Trainor Christmas is the fourth major-label studio album, and debut Christmas album, by American singer-songwriter Meghan Trainor, released on October 30, 2020, by Epic Records and her own label, Honest OG Recordings. The album contains cover versions of Christmas standards, such as "It's Beginning to Look a Lot Like Christmas" (1951) and "Last Christmas" (1984), as well as six original recordings. Trainor worked with producers including her brother Justin Trainor and Asa Welch, and co-wrote songs with the former and her other brother Ryan, among others, to create the album. Artists who are featured on A Very Trainor Christmas include Earth, Wind & Fire, Seth MacFarlane, Trainor's cousins Jayden, Jenna & Marcus Toney, and father Gary Trainor. A Target edition of the album includes a cover version of "A Holly Jolly Christmas" (1964) and the original song "I'll Be Home", which first appeared on the Epic EP I'll Be Home for Christmas (2014). A deluxe edition of the album was released on October 29, 2021.

Background and release
Meghan Trainor forayed into Christmas music by contributing the original song "I'll Be Home" to the Epic Records EP I'll Be Home for Christmas in 2014. She featured on Brett Eldredge's cover version of "Baby, It's Cold Outside" (1944), for his 2016 album Glow, and released a cover version of "White Christmas" (1942) two years later for Spotify Singles Christmas.

In January 2020, shortly before the release of Trainor's third major-label studio album Treat Myself (2020), Billboard announced that she had started writing original Christmas songs, planning to release them later in the year. In a June 2020 interview, Trainor stated that she had been "trying to finish [her] Christmas album", further confirming the project. On September 9, 2020, she officially announced the album title as A Very Trainor Christmas on her social media accounts, along with the release date and artwork, which features her biting a candy cane while dressed in a Christmas hat and a tinsel and bows-adorned dress. A trailer for the album was released the following day, consisting of home footage of Trainor and her family. On October 7, 2020, she released the original song "My Kind of Present", accompanied by a cover version of "Last Christmas" (1984). A Very Trainor Christmas was released on October 30. During the 2022 Disney Parks Christmas Day Parade, she performed "My Kind of Present" live from a balcony on Main Street, U.S.A. at Disneyland Resort, dressed in a pink Minnie Mouse inspired costume with two backup singers.

Composition
Trainor's entire family participated in the creation of A Very Trainor Christmas, as songwriters, background vocalists, producers, and instrumentalists. Her cousins Jayden, Jenna & Marcus Toney, and father Gary Trainor, appear as featured artists, while her brother Justin took part in production and songwriting, and Ryan in the latter. Regarding this decision, Trainor stated that she is "a Christmas baby", and had always dreamed of "releas[ing] a Christmas Album and to do it with [her] family [made] it that much better". Earth, Wind & Fire and Seth MacFarlane were chosen as collaborators due to them being her family's "all-time-favorites". Trainor stated that her family "worship[s] the ground they walk on – so to get them to feature on this album still doesn't feel real. Best Christmas Present Ever!"

A Very Trainor Christmas contains 10 cover versions of Christmas standards, such as "It's Beginning to Look a Lot Like Christmas" (1951) and "Last Christmas", as well as six original recordings. A Target edition of the album includes a cover version of "A Holly Jolly Christmas" (1964) and the original song "I'll Be Home", which first appeared on the Epic EP I'll Be Home for Christmas (2014).

Critical reception

AllMusic writer Stephen Thomas Erlewine stated that Trainor approaches A Very Trainor Christmas with similar "gusto" as the "old-fashioned showbiz razzle-dazzle" style she has always had. He added that the original recordings sound the "most vivacious", but the whole album is "firmly within the realm of spirited seasonal soundtrack". Writing for Idolator, Mike Wass called it a "resounding success", adding that it "sparks joy", and its incorporation of various genres "makes sure there's something for everybody". He concluded that A Very Trainor Christmas has the potential to "become a go-to Christmas soundtrack for families across America in the years to come". Knoxville News Sentinels Chuck Campbell wrote that the album lacks "well-crafted classics" to set it apart from other holiday albums, and its momentum is "routinely thwarted" by a combination of familiar and unfamiliar songs, which lead to "the party never hit[ting] its stride".

Commercial performance
A Very Trainor Christmas debuted at number 144 on the Billboard 200 issued for November 14, 2020, with 7,500 album-equivalent units (including 4,200 pure sales) according to Rolling Stone. It has since peaked at number 89. Trainor and MacFarlane's cover version of "White Christmas" debuted at number 24 on the Adult Contemporary chart the same week marking the third holiday entry for both artists and it later peaked at number 1 on the chart. The album also entered the Top Holiday Albums chart at number 7 and the UK Download Albums chart at number 47.

Track listing

Deluxe edition
A deluxe edition of A Very Trainor Christmas adds the following songs as tracks 1-3:
"Christmas Coupon" (writer: M. Trainor) – 3:12
"Rockin' Around the Christmas Tree" (writer: Johnny Marks) – 2:28
"Christmas (Baby Please Come Home)" (writer: Jeff Barry, Ellie Greenwich, Phil Spector) – 2:28
As well as all of the songs from the standard edition.

Notes
 Digital editions of A Very Trainor Christmas feature all 18 tracks, while physical versions of the CD album do not feature "Holly Jolly Christmas" and "I'll Be Home". These are exclusive to the Target CD in the US.

Charts

References

2020 Christmas albums
Christmas albums by American artists
Epic Records albums
Meghan Trainor albums
Pop Christmas albums